Epilepia melanobasis is a species of snout moth in the genus Epilepia. It was described by George Hampson in 1906, and it is known from South Africa, Namibia and Zimbabwe.

References

Moths described in 1906
Epipaschiinae
Insects of Namibia
Moths of Africa